Spencer Nilsen (born April 9, 1961) is an American singer/songwriter, video game music composer, film composer and producer, graphic designer, and educator.  He is best known for his soundtracks to the Sega CD versions of Batman Returns, Ecco the Dolphin, Ecco: The Tides of Time, Jurassic Park, The Adventures of Batman & Robin and The Amazing Spider-Man vs. The Kingpin as well as the North American version of Sonic CD. His latest work is Here and Gone an album of 10 original songs produced and engineered by Spyder James. Nilsen sang and played all the instruments on the record, with the exception of acoustic and electric guitars performed by Daniel Reiter.

Nilsen has also worked on a number of film and television scores and released a breakthrough new-age album titled Architects of Change in 1989.

He is the former president of Ex'pression College for Digital Arts in Emeryville, California, and co-chairman of the board of Music in Schools Today. He was also the owner and co-founder of Illumina Studios, a full-service media design and production company. Spencer currently teaches and mentors students at Sonoma Academy college prep high school in Santa Rosa, CA.

Works
Video games

Other work

References

External links
Official website

Artist profile at OverClocked ReMix
Detailed profile

Living people
1961 births
Video game composers